Chandra Bhushan Singh, also as Munnoo Babu (born 14 October 1944) is an Indian politician who was a member of the 13th and 14th Lok Sabhas for Farrukhabad in Uttar Pradesh.

References

External links
 Official biographical sketch in Parliament of India website

1944 births
Living people
People from Farrukhabad
India MPs 2004–2009
Samajwadi Party politicians
Lok Sabha members from Uttar Pradesh
India MPs 1996–1997
India MPs 1999–2004
People from Kannauj district
Bharatiya Janata Party politicians from Uttar Pradesh
Samajwadi Party politicians from Uttar Pradesh